Vladislav Varaksa (born 26 August 2004) is a Belarusian professional footballer who plays for Neman Grodno.

References

External links 
 
 

2004 births
Living people
People from Uzda District
Sportspeople from Minsk Region
Belarusian footballers
Association football midfielders
FC Dynamo Brest players
FC Uzda players
FC Neman Grodno players